Anna Silvander (born 22 June 1993) is a Swedish middle-distance runner. She represented her country at two outdoor and three indoor European Championships.

International competitions

Personal bests
Outdoor
800 metres – 2:02.53 (Tallinn 2015)
1000 metres – 2:37.78 (Gothenburg 2016)
1500 metres – 4:11.23 (Ninove 2018)
Indoor
800 metres – 2:02.54 (Boston 2017)
1500 metres – 4:11.01 (Glasgow 2019)

References

1993 births
Living people
Swedish female middle-distance runners